The 1978 Rhode Island gubernatorial election was held on November 7, 1978. Incumbent Democrat J. Joseph Garrahy defeated Republican nominee Lincoln Almond with 62.79% of the vote.

General election

Candidates
Major party candidates
J. Joseph Garrahy, Democratic
Lincoln Almond, Republican 

Other candidates
Joseph A. Doorley Jr., Independent

Results

References

1978
Rhode Island
Gubernatorial